Ajmer - V (Naya Bazar) was a single-member constituency of the Legislative Assembly of the Ajmer State, India. The constituency covered four wards of the Ajmer municipality; No. 1, 3, 7 and 9. The constituency had 11,467 voters at the time of the 1951 assembly election.

References

Assembly constituencies of Ajmer